In Finnish mythology, Tuoni was the god of Tuonela (the underworld), and darkness personified. He was the husband of Tuonetar. Their children included Kipu-Tyttö, Tuonenpoika, and Loviatar, who were divinities of suffering. When in human form, he appears as an old man with three fingers on each hand and a hat of darkness.

References

Finnish gods
Underworld gods